A cisgender (can be shortened to cis or cissexual) person is someone who has a gender identity that matches their sex assigned at birth. A person whose sex was assigned male at birth and identifies as a boy or a man, or someone whose sex was assigned female at birth and identifies as a girl or a woman, is considered cisgender.

Cisgender people may or may not conform to gender norms and stereotypes associated with their gender identity. A cisgender man may not necessarily exhibit all stereotypical masculine traits, and a cisgender woman may not necessarily exhibit all stereotypical feminine traits.

The word cisgender is the antonym of transgender. The prefix cis- is Latin and means 'on this side of'. The term cisgender was coined in 1994 and entered into dictionaries starting in 2015 as a result of changes in social discourse about gender.

Cisgender is a neutral term that is not intended to judge or value the experience of individuals who identify as cisgender. It is simply a way to describe a person's gender identity based on their assigned sex at birth.

Etymology and usage 

Cisgender has its origin in the Latin-derived prefix cis-, meaning 'on this side of', which is the opposite of trans-, meaning 'across from' or 'on the other side of'. This usage can be seen in the cis–trans distinction in chemistry, the cis and trans sides of the Golgi apparatus in cellular biology, the cis–trans or complementation test in genetics, in Ciscaucasia (from the Russian perspective), in the ancient Roman term Cisalpine Gaul (i.e., 'Gaul on this side of the Alps'), Ciskei and Transkei (separated by the Kei River), and more recently, Cisjordan, as distinguished from Transjordan. In the case of gender, cis- describes the alignment of gender identity with assigned sex.

Sociologists Kristen Schilt and Laurel Westbrook define cisgender as a label for "individuals who have a match between the gender they were assigned at birth, their bodies, and their personal identity". A number of derivatives of the terms cisgender and cissexual include cis male for "male assigned male at birth", cis female for "female assigned female at birth", analogously cis man and cis woman, and cissexism and cissexual assumption. In addition, one study published in the Journal of the International AIDS Society used the term cisnormativity, akin to heteronormativity. EliR. Green wrote in 2006, "cisgendered is used [instead of the more popular gender normative] to refer to people who do not identify with a gender diverse experience, without enforcing existence of a normative gender expression".

Julia Serano has defined cissexual as "people who are not transsexual and who have only ever experienced their mental and physical sexes as being aligned", while cisgender is a slightly narrower term for those who do not identify as transgender (a larger cultural category than the more clinical transsexual). For Jessica Cadwallader, cissexual is "a way of drawing attention to the unmarked norm, against which trans is identified, in which a person feels that their gender identity matches their body/sex". Jillana Enteen wrote in 2009 that cissexual is "meant to show that there are embedded assumptions encoded in expecting this seamless conformity".

Serano also uses the related term cissexism, "which is the belief that transsexuals' identified genders are inferior to, or less authentic than, those of cissexuals". In 2010, the term cisgender privilege appeared in academic literature, defined as the "set of unearned advantages that individuals who identify as the gender they were assigned at birth accrue solely due to having a cisgender identity".

Medical academics use the term and have recognized its importance in transgender studies since the 1990s.

History

German 
In German, according to Marquis Bey, "proto-cisgender discourse arose in 1914 with Ernst Burchard's introduction of cis/trans distinctions to sexology. Cisvestitismus, or a type of inclination to wear gender-conforming clothing, was contrasted for Burchard with transvestitismus, or cross-dressing." German sexologist Volkmar Sigusch cited his two-part 1991 article "" ("Transsexuals and our nosomorphic view") as the origin of the neologism cissexual ( in German) when he used it in his 1998 essay "The Neosexual Revolution".

English 
In English, the term cisgender was coined in 1994 in a Usenet newsgroup about transgender topics. On that newsgroup, Dana Defosse, then a graduate student, sought a way to refer to non-transgender people that avoided marginalizing transgender people or implying that transgender people were an other. Three decades later, in a personal essay, Defosse said she didn't intend the word as an insult. She says she doesn't believe the word cisgender "caused problemsit only revealed them."

The terms cisgender and cissexual were used in a 2006 article in the Journal of Lesbian Studies and Serano's 2007 book Whipping Girl, after which the term gained some popularity among English-speaking activists and scholars.

In February 2014, Facebook began offering "custom" gender options, allowing users to identify with one or more gender-related terms from a selected list, including cis, cisgender, and others. Cisgender was also added to the Oxford English Dictionary in 2015, defined as "designating a person whose sense of personal identity corresponds to the sex and gender assigned to him or her at birth (in contrast with transgender)". Perspectives on History has stated that since this inclusion, the term cisgender has increasingly become common usage.

Critiques 

Use of the term cisgender has at times been controversial. Novelist John Boyne rejected the use of the term cisgender in an article in The Irish Times. He considers himself not as a cis man, but as just a man. He argues that one person should not "force an unwanted term onto another".

From feminism and gender studies 

Krista Scott-Dixon wrote in 2009: "I prefer the term non-trans to other options such as cissexual/cisgendered." She believes the term non-trans is clearer to average people and will help normalize transgender individuals.

Women's and gender studies scholar Mimi Marinucci writes that some consider the 'cisgender–transgender' binary distinction to be just as dangerous or self-defeating as the masculine–feminine gender binary because it lumps together people who identify as lesbian, gay, or bisexual (LGB) arbitrarily and over-simplistically with a heteronormative class of people as opposed to with transgender people. Characterizing LGB individuals together with heterosexual, non-trans people may problematically suggest that LGB individuals, unlike transgender individuals, "experience no mismatch between their own gender identity and gender expression and cultural expectations regarding gender identity and expression".

Gender studies professor Chris Freeman criticises the term, describing it as "clunky, unhelpful and maybe even regressive" for "[creating]or re-[creating]a gender binary".

From intersex organizations 

Intersex people are born with atypical physical sex characteristics that can complicate initial sex assignment and lead to involuntary or coercive medical treatment. The term cisgender "can get confusing" in relation to people with intersex conditions, although some intersex people use the term according to the Interact Advocates for Intersex Youth Inter/Act project. Hida Viloria of Intersex Campaign for Equality notes that, as a person born with an intersex body who has a non-binary sense of gender identity that "matches" their body, they are both cisgender and gender non-conforming, presumably opposites according to cisgender definition, and that this evidences the term's basis on a binary sex model that does not account for intersex people's existence. Viloria also critiques the fact that the term sex assigned at birth is used in one of cisgender definitions without noting that babies are assigned male or female regardless of intersex status in most of the world, stating that doing so obfuscates the birth of intersex babies and frames gender identity within a binary male/female sex model that fails to account for both the existence of natally congruent gender non-conforming gender identities, and gender-based discrimination against intersex people based on natal sex characteristics rather than on gender identity or expression, such as "normalizing" infant genital surgeries.

See also 

 Cisnormativity
 Cissexism
 Endosex
 Feminist views on transgender topics
 Gender taxonomy
 List of transgender-related topics
 Womyn-born womyn

References

Further reading 
 Gorton R., Buth J., and Spade D. Medical Therapy and Health Maintenance for Transgender Men: A Guide for Health Care Providers . Lyon-Martin Women's Health Services. San Francisco, CA. 2005.

External links 

 Gender and Sexuality Center FAQ, University of Texas at Austin Division of Diversity and Community Engagement
 The Queer Community Has to Stop Being Transphobic: Realizing My Cisgender Privilege, Todd Clayton, The Huffington Post, February 27, 2013
 Researching Early Uses of “Cisgender”, Avery Dame, American Historical Association Today, May 22, 2017

Gender identity
Linguistic controversies
Transgender
1990s neologisms
1994 neologisms